Mincey Glacier is a glacier,  long, draining the southern slopes of the Anderson Heights in the Bush Mountains of Antarctica and flowing southeast to enter Shackleton Glacier at Thanksgiving Point. It was discovered and photographed by U.S. Navy Operation Highjump on the flights of February 16, 1947, and named by the Advisory Committee on Antarctic Names for Master Sergeant A.V. Mincey, United States Marine Corps, radio operator of Flight 8A.

References

Glaciers of Dufek Coast